The 2016 Swedish FIM Speedway Grand Prix was the sixth race of the 2016 Speedway Grand Prix season. It took place on 14 August at the G&B Arena in Målilla, Sweden, after the initial scheduled staging on 13 August was cancelled due to the weather.

Riders 
For the sixth successive Grand Prix first reserve Fredrik Lindgren replaced Jarosław Hampel, who had injured himself during the 2015 Speedway World Cup and was not fit to compete. The Speedway Grand Prix Commission also nominated Peter Ljung as the wild card, and Jacob Thorssell and Kim Nilsson both as Track Reserves.

Results 
The Grand Prix was won by Greg Hancock, who beat Jason Doyle, Piotr Pawlicki Jr. and Chris Holder in the final. As a result, Hancock stretched his lead in the world championship standings to 12 points, with Doyle now sitting joint-second with defending world champion Tai Woffinden, who failed to make the semi-finals.

Heat details

The intermediate classification

References

See also 
 Motorcycle speedway

Sweden
August 2016 sports events in Europe
2016 in Swedish motorsport
2016